"The Baby Party" is a short story published by F. Scott Fitzgerald in Hearst's International Cosmopolitan (February 1925).

Plot 

The story centers on a young couple, John and Edith Andros. They are the parents of Ede, their two-and-half-year-old daughter. Although the prospect of having a child to continue his name and livelihood appeals to the father, the day-to-day realities soon irritate him. Early on it is apparent this creates discord among the couple. 

The daughter is invited to a party, which John begrudgingly attends. After Ede injures one of the other children, he ends up in a fistfight with another father. At the close of the story, he insists his wife apologize for the mess, and he holds his daughter while she falls asleep in his arms. 

In the story the children have characteristics of adults while the adults act like children.

History 

"The Baby Party" was written while Fitzgerald was in his infamous period of financial hardship. He was completing the final proof stage for The Great Gatsby and needed to support himself financially. It was later collected in All the Sad Young Men.

References

External links
 Full text of "The Baby Party" at Project Gutenberg Australia

1925 short stories
Short stories by F. Scott Fitzgerald
Works originally published in Cosmopolitan (magazine)